The Morgan 3 Wheeler is a three-wheeled roadster produced by British manufacturer Morgan Motor Company from 2012 to 2021. It was unveiled at the 2011 Geneva Motor Show.

Technical
The 3 Wheeler was initially said to have a Harley-Davidson Screaming Eagle V-twin engine and a Mazda 5-speed manual transmission, and was estimated to deliver  at the rear wheel. However, there was a surprise when the prototype that was shown at Geneva had an S&S engine. Production three-wheelers turned out to have S&S engines. The three-wheeler was homologated as a motorcycle in the United States.

Orders and deliveries
The company states that 850 deposits have been taken since the announcement in 2011. Customer deliveries began in Europe in February 2012. USA deliveries were in June 2012, when the first imported three-wheeler was displayed in New York City and at the Greenwich Concours d'Elegance.

Appearance on Top Gear
The Morgan 3 Wheeler was featured in a Series 18 episode of UK motoring show Top Gear where presenter Richard Hammond picked the Morgan 3 Wheeler in a comparison of track-day cars. The 3 Wheeler won the "Not-A-Car of the Year 2011" in Top Gear.

Successor model
The current generation model of the Morgan 3 Wheeler will end production sometime in 2021 with a run-out version called the P101. It is expected to be replaced with the next generation successor in 2022.

Electric variant

Morgan was working on an electric prototype version of the Three Wheeler called the “EV3”. The electric motor was rated at 101 bhp, and was estimated to produce 150 miles of range (240 km) with a 20 kWh lithium-ion battery. Production of the EV3 was cancelled in late 2018.

See also
List of motorized trikes
Triking

References

External links

Morgan Motor Company page

3-Wheeler
Cars introduced in 2012
Cars introduced in 2016
Rear-wheel-drive vehicles
Cars powered by 2-cylinder engines
Roadsters
2020s cars
Three-wheeled motor vehicles